The Borstal Institute for juveniles now called The Senior Correctional Centre is a juvenile correction institute under the Ghana Prisons Service (GPS).

The centre is a correction centre for people who are under 18 years old and have been convicted of criminal or civil offenses. The period that a convict spends in the centre is aimed at reforming him or her so they can fit into society easily after their stay at the centre.

See also
 Ghana Prisons Service

References

Ministries and Agencies of State of Ghana